Măgheruș may refer to several places in Romania:

 Măgheruș, a village in Ozun Commune, Covasna County
 Măgheruș, a village in the city of Toplița, Harghita County
 Măgheruș, a village in Nadeș Commune, Mureș County
 Șieu-Măgheruș, a commune in Bistrița-Năsăud County
 Măgheruș (Bega Veche), a tributary of the Bega Veche in Timiș County
 Măgheruș (Mureș), a tributary of the Mureș in Harghita County
 Măgheruș, a tributary of the Șieu in Bistrița-Năsăud County
 Mogheruș, a tributary of the Uz